"Glory of Love" is an 1986 hit song by Peter Cetera

Glory of Love may also refer to:

Music
Glory of Love (album), 1968 studio album by Herbie Mann
The Glory of Love, 1969 album of cover songs by Eddy Arnold
"The Glory of Love" (song), written by Billy Hill, a 1936 hit for Benny Goodman and covered by many artists like Bette Midler, Paul McCartney
"Glory of Love", 1985 song by The Armoury Show, from the album Waiting for the Floods

Literature
The Glory of Love, story by Leslie Beresford on which the 1923 film While Paris Sleeps was based

See also
Alive with the Glory of Love, a single from Say Anything from their 2006 album ...Is a Real Boy